Tim Blair (born 1965) is an Australian editor, journalist, political commentator and blogger. He works for The Daily Telegraph in Sydney. 

In mid-2001, Blair began blogging at Blogspot. By 2004, he had attracted a significant following, the Sydney Morning Herald describing him as a "top dog among the new Australian digerati" who "some days draws more than 20,000 readers to his website." In addition to running his blog, Blair was previously a news editor and regular columnist for the now-defunct The Bulletin. He has also worked as a journalist and senior editor at Time, Truth and Sports Illustrated, and has also written for Fox News. He has contributed a monthly column titled "Sweetness & Light" to Quadrant since May 2017. Blair has also appeared on 4BC, Radio National and the ABC programme Insiders.

Politics

Starting a few days after George W. Bush's visit to Baghdad during Thanksgiving 2003, Blair has documented and disproved claims that a roast turkey that Bush was photographed holding up was plastic. The roast turkey was real.

References

External links
 Tim Blair Blog - The Daily Telegraph (May 2008)
 Tim Blair's weblog - archive only since move to Daily Telegraph site
 Right Wing News - The Tim Blair Interview (April 2002)

1965 births
Living people
Australian bloggers
Australian journalists
Quadrant (magazine) people
Australian columnists